Edgar Adolfo Hernández Téllez (born 27 August 1982) is a Mexican former professional footballer who played as a goalkeeper.

Honours
Querétaro
Copa MX: Apertura 2016

Oaxaca
Ascenso MX: Apertura 2017

External links
 

1982 births
Living people
Liga MX players
Club América footballers
Tigres UANL footballers
San Luis F.C. players
Chiapas F.C. footballers
Club Puebla players
Querétaro F.C. footballers
Atlas F.C. footballers
Club Necaxa footballers
Association football goalkeepers
People from Reynosa
Footballers from Tamaulipas
Mexican footballers